Annona (from Taíno annon) is a genus of flowering plants in the pawpaw/sugar apple family, Annonaceae. It is the second largest genus in the family after Guatteria, containing approximately 166 species of mostly Neotropical and Afrotropical trees and shrubs.

The generic name derives from anón, a Hispaniolan Taíno word for the fruit. Paleoethnobotanical studies have dated Annona exploitation and cultivation in the Yautepec River region of Medicoto to approximately 1000 BC. Plants of the genus have several common names, including sugar-apple, soursop, and guanabana.

Currently, seven Annona species and one hybrid are grown for domestic or commercial use, mostly for the edible and nutritious fruits; several others also produce edible fruits. Many of the species are used in traditional medicines for the treatment of a variety of diseases, though their efficacy has yet to be validated scientifically. Several annonaceous species have been found to contain acetogenins, a class of natural compounds with a wide variety of biological activities. The first complete genome for a species in this genus (Annona muricata) was published in 2021.

Description
Annona species are taprooted, evergreen or semideciduous, tropical trees or shrubs. The plants typically grow in areas where air temperature does not drop below , especially Cuba, Jamaica, Central America, India the Philippines and Calabria (southern Italy). However, they have also been known to grow in certain parts of the Andes mountains in South America and in Florida.

The woody trunks have thin bark that has broad and shallow depressions or fissures which join together and are scaly, giving rise to slender, stiff, cylindrical, and tapering shoots with raised pores and naked buds. Leaf blades can be leathery or thin and rather soft or pliable, bald or hairy.

The flowering stalks rise from axils, or occasionally from axillary buds on main stems or older stems, or as solitary flowers or small bundles of flowers. Usually, the three or four deciduous sepals are smaller than the outer petals that do not overlap while in bud. Six to eight fleshy petals are arranged in two whorls—the petals of the outer whorl are larger and do not overlap; inner petals are ascending and distinctively smaller, and nectar glands are darker pigmented. The numerous stamens are ball-shaped, club-shaped, or curved and hooded or pointed beyond anther sac. Numerous pistils, attached directly to the base, are partially united to various degrees with a distinct stigma, with one or two ovules per pistil; the style and stigma are club-shaped or narrowly conic.

One fleshy, ovate to spherical fruit is produced per flower. Each fruit consists of many individual small fruits or syncarps, with one syncarp and seed per pistil. Seeds are bean-like with tough coats; the seed kernels are toxic.

Pollination occurs via Dynastid scarab beetles, which appear to be basic generalists within the genus Annona. Those species of Annona which are more morphologically derived, as well as all Rollinia spp., possess reduced floral chambers and attract small beetles such as Nitidulidae or Staphylinidae.

Toxicology

The compound annonacin and dozens of other acetogenins contained in the seeds and fruit of some members of Annonaceae such as Annona muricata (soursop) are neurotoxins and seem to be the cause of a Parkinson-like neurodegenerative disease. The only group of people known to be affected by this disease live on the Caribbean island of Guadeloupe and the problem presumably occurs with the consumption of plants containing annonacin. The disorder is a so-called tauopathy associated with a pathologic accumulation of tau protein in the brain. Experimental results published in 2007 demonstrated for the first time that the plant neurotoxin annonacin is responsible for this accumulation.

Selected species

There are 169 accepted Annona species, as of April 2021, according to Plants of the World Online. 

Annona acuminata
Annona acutiflora
Annona ambotay
Annona angustifolia
Annona asplundiana
Annona atabapensis
Annona aurantiaca
Annona bullata
Annona cacans – araticum-cagão
Annona cascarilloides
Annona cherimola – cherimoya
Annona chrysophylla – graines
Annona conica
Annona cordifolia
Annona coriacea
Annona cornifolia
Annona crassiflora – araticum do cerrado, marolo
Annona crassivenia
Annona cristalensis
Annona cubensis
Annona deceptrix
Annona deminuta
Annona dioica
Annona diversifolia
Annona dolichophylla
Annona ecuadorensis
Annona ekmanii
Annona foetida
Annona fosteri
Annona glabra – pond apple, alligator apple, monkey apple
Annona globiflora
Annona haematantha
Annona haitiensis
Annona hypoglauca
Annona hystricoides
Annona jahnii
Annona jamaicensis
Annona longiflora
Annona macrocarpa auct.
Annona macroprophyllata
Annona manabiensis
Annona moaensis
Annona montana Macfad. – mountain soursop
Annona muricata – soursop, graviola
Annona nitida
Annona nutans
Annona oligocarpa
Annona paludosa
Annona papilionella
Annona pittieri
Annona praetermissa
Annona purpurea – soncoya
Annona reticulata – custard apple, bullock's heart
Annona rigida
Annona rosei
Annona salzmannii – beach sugar apple
Annona scleroderma – poshe-te, cawesh, wild red custard apple
Annona sclerophylla
Annona senegalensis – African custard apple
Annona sericea
Annona spraguei
Annona squamosa – sugar apple, sweetsop
Annona stenophylla
Annona tenuiflora
Annona tomentosa
Annona trunciflora

Hybrids
Annona × atemoya – atemoya

Insects and diseases
Annona species are generally disease-free. They are susceptible to some fungi and wilt. Ants may also be a problem, since they promote mealybugs on the fruit.

Insects

Braephratiloides cubense (annona seed borer)
Bepratelloides cubense (annona seed borer)
Morganella longispina (plumose scale)
Philephedra n.sp. (Philephedra scale)
Pseudococcus sp. (mealybugs)
Xyleborus sp. (ambrosia beetles)
Ammiscus polygrophoides
Anastrepha atrox
Anastrepha barandianae
Anastrepha bistrigata
Anastrepha chiclayae
Anastrepha disticta
Anastrepha extensa
Anastrepha fraterculus
Anastrepha oblicua
Anastrepha serpentina
Anastrepha striata
Anastrepha suspensa
Apate monachus
Bactrocera spp.
Bephrata maculicollis
Brevipalpus spp.
Ceratitis capitata
Cerconota anonella
Coccoidea spp.
Coccus viridis (green scale)
Emanadia flavipennis
Gelwchiidae spp.
Heliothrips haemorphoidalis
Leosynodes elegantales
Lyonetia spp.
Oiketicus kirby
Orthezia olivicola
Phyllocnistis spp.
Pinnaspis aspidistrae
Planococcus citri
Saissetia nigra
Talponia spp.
Tenuipalpidae
Tetranynchus spp.
Thrips

Fungi

Armillaria (oak root fungus)
Ascochyta cherimolaer
Athelia rolfsii
Botryodiplodia theobromae
Cercospora annonaceae
Cladosporium carpophilum
Colletotrichium spp
Colletotrichium annonicola
Colletotrichum gloeosporioides
Diplodia natalensis (dry fruit rot)
Erythricium salmonicolor
Fumagina spp
Fusarium solani
Gloeosporium spp
Glomerella cingulata
Isariopsis anonarum
Monilia spp
Nectria episphaeria
Oidium spp
Phakopsora cherimolae
Phomopsis spp
Phomopsis annonacearum
Phyllosticta spp
Phythium spp
Phytophtora palmivora
Phytophtora parasitica
Rhizoctonia noxia
Rhizoctonia solani
Rhizoctonia spp
Rhizopus nigricans
Rhizopus stolonifer
Salssetia oleare
Uredo cherimola
Verticillium spp (wilt)
Zignoella annonicola

Nematodes

Cephalobidae spp.
Dorylaimidae spp.
Gracilacus spp.
Helicotylenchus spp.
Hemicycliophora spp.
Hoplolaimidae spp.
Meloidogyne incognita spp.
Pratylenchus spp.
Paratylenchus micoletzky. Rhabditis spp.
Tylenchorhynchus spp.
Xiphinema americanum

Algae
Cephaleuros virescens
Cephalosporium spp.
Paecilomyces spp.

Diseases
Fruit rot

References

External links

Type Collections of Neotropical Annonaceae – Annona – has pictures and details on these and other Annona species

Images

 
Tropical fruit
Annonaceae genera